The Cave of Maltravieso in Cáceres, Extremadura, Spain, was discovered in 1951.
It shows traces of human occupation from the Middle Paleolithic.
It contains cave art, most notably a total of 71 hand stencils, enumerated in the 1990s using ultraviolet photography, but also linear designs and some animal paintings.
In a 2018 study based on uranium-thorium dating, a hand stencil from the Cave of Maltravieso was dated to 64,000 years ago. 
This would make it  Middle Paleolithic art, predating the presence of European early modern humans, with important implications for Neanderthal behavior.

A visitor center, the Centro de interpretación de la Cueva de Maltravieso, opened in 1999. Other nearby Paleolithic caves are those of El Conejar, Santa Ana and Castañar de Ibor.

References

Callejo Serano, Carlos  (1958): La cueva prehistórica de Maltravieso junto a Cáceres, Cáceres.
Callejo Serano, Carlos (1970), "Catálogo de las pinturas de la Cueva de Maltravieso." XIº Congreso Nacional de Arqueología. Mérida, 1968, Zaragoza, 154-174.
Callejo Serano, Carlos  (1981): El símbolo de la mano en las pinturas rupestres,  Coloquios Históricos de Extremadura,  Trujillo.
Ripoll López, S. et al.,  (1997): "Avance al estudio de la Cueva de Maltravieso (Cáceres). El arte rupestre paleolítico en Extremadura", Jornadas sobre Arte Rupestre en Extremadura. Extremadura Arqueológica, Cáceres-Mérida, vol. VII: 95-117.
Ripoll Perelló, E., Moure Romanillo, J.A. (1979): "Grabados rupestres de la Cueva de Maltravieso (Cáceres)",  Estudios dedicados a Carlos Callejo Serrano Cáceres, 567-572.
Sanchidrián Torti, J.L. (1988/1989): "Perspectiva actual del arte paleolítico de la Cueva de Maltravieso (Cáceres)", Ars Praehistorica VII-VIII, Barcelona,pp, 123-129.

External links

turismoextremadura.com
arqueotur.org
evoluciona.org

Caves of Spain
Rock art in Spain
Cáceres, Spain
Neanderthal sites